Garabasa is a part of Bagbera, a census town in Purbi Singhbhum district in the state of Jharkhand, India.

East Singhbhum district

Neighbourhoods in Jamshedpur